Gift Horse may refer to:

 Gift Horse (album), an album by Roots music band Lost Dogs
 Gift Horse (band), A Power Pop/Rock Band from Brisbane, Australia.
 Gift Horse (film), a 1952 British film starring Trevor Howard and Richard Attenborough
 "Gift Horse", a song by The Jealous Girlfriends from the album The Jealous Girlfriends
 Gift Horse (sculpture), a sculpture by Hans Haacke positioned on the Fourth Plinth of Trafalgar Square, London, in March 2015

See also
The Gift Horse, an episode of Frasier